Pareshan Khattak, (10 December 1932 – 16 April 2009) real name Gahami Jan Khattak, former Vice-Chancellor, Pashto poet and writer and former Chairman University Grants Commission.
 
Born in Karak, Pakistan he joined education department in 1958, after obtaining a master's degree in History, he joined the Pashto Academy as Assistant Research Officer. Due to his exceptional talent and leadership skills, he was then named as Director and then Chairman of the Pashto academy.

Literary works
His book (in Urdu) entitled, “Pashtoon Koon” (Who are Pashtoons ?) was one of the best sellers throughout the country, and is considered an authoritative reference on its subject matter. Professor Pareshan Khattak has written various masterpieces in Pashto literature including “Drana Pakhto” and “Leek Dood.” In addition, Professor Sahab has published his poetry under the title of  “Tanakay” and “Hagha Dwa Malalaye Stargay.”

The poetry of Professor Pareshan Khattak is mostly in the form of Nazam, and Ghazaal and most of his works are considered as masterpieces in Pashto Literature. The reader while going through the contents of his poetry becomes enchanted in the selection of words and the philosophy shaping his poetry. His books titled “Pukhtana Kochay,” “Dozakhi Pakhto,” “Drana Pukhtana,” “Khyber,” “Iteraff,” and “Aziza Meena” are popular reads in Khyber-Pakhtunkhwa, Pakistan and pashtun regions of Afghanistan.

He also served as Chairman Pakistan Academy of Letters in 1984-85 and Professor in Gomal University, Dera Ismail Khan.

Footnotes

1932 births
2009 deaths
Pashtun people
Pashto-language poets
People from Karak District
20th-century Pakistani poets
Pakistani civil servants
Recipients of Sitara-i-Imtiaz
Recipients of Tamgha-e-Imtiaz